A constitutional referendum was held in Denmark on 23 May 1939. Voters were asked whether they approved of a new constitution. Although it was approved by 91.9% of those who voted, a turnout of only 48.9% meant that the percentage of eligible voters approving it was only 44.46%, below the 45% required by the existing constitution of 1915.

The Danish constitution was finally altered to its present form following a 1953 referendum.

Proposed changes
The two primary changes in the proposed constitution from 1939 was lowering the electoral age from 25 to 23 years, and replacing the Landsting with a new chamber of parliament, the Rigsting.

Additionally, the united parliament consisting of the members of the two other chambers was to become a third chamber of parliament. The united parliament would handle the more important types of bills, including the budget and proposed changes to the constitution. Other bills could be proposed in either the Folketing or the Rigsting, and in order to pass they would have to go through three readings in the chamber in which they originated, and two readings in the other. This would have been a simplification of the existing process where all bills had to go through three readings in each of the two chambers.

Results

See also
The system of qualified unicameralism used in the Norwegian parliament until 2009, similar to the "united parliament" system above.

Notes

Referendums in Denmark
Denmark
Constitutional referendum
20th century in Danish law
Constitutional referendums
Denmark